Hendrik Ate "Han" Bergsma (born 16 February 1961, in Akkrum) is a sailor from the Netherlands, who represented his country at the 1992 Summer Olympics in Barcelona. Bergsma as crew in the Dutch Soling with Roy Heiner as helmsman and Peter Burggraaff as fellow crew member, Bergsma took 18th place.

Professional life
Bergsma is nowadays Manager projectsupport at ProRail.

Further reading

1992 Olympics (Barcelona)

References

Living people
1961 births
People from Boarnsterhim
Sportspeople from Friesland
Dutch male sailors (sport)
Sailors at the 1992 Summer Olympics – Soling
Olympic sailors of the Netherlands
20th-century Dutch people
21st-century Dutch people